Uroporphyrinogen I is an isomer of uroporphyrinogen III, a metabolic intermediate in the biosynthesis of heme.  A type of porphyria is caused by production of uroporphyrinogen I instead of III.

Biosynthesis and metabolism
In living organisms, uroporphyrinogen I occurs as a side branch of the main porphyrin synthesis pathway. In the normal pathway, the linear tetrapyrrole precursor preuroporphyrinogen (a substituted hydroxymethylbilane) is converted by the enzyme uroporphyrinogen-III cosynthase into the cyclic uroporphyrinogen III; which is then converted to coproporphyrinogen III on the way to porphyrins like heme.  Uroporphyrinogen I is instead produced spontaneously from preuroporphyrinogen when the enzyme is not present.

The difference between the I and III forms is the arrangement of the four carboxyethyl groups (propionic acid, "P") and the four carboxymethyl groups (acetic acid, "A").  The non-enzymatic conversion to uroporphyrinogen I results in the sequence AP-AP-AP-AP, whereas the enzymatic conversion into uroporphyrinogen III leads to reversal of one AP-group and hence an AP-AP-AP-PA arrangement.

If synthesized, uroporphyrinogen I is then converted into coproporphyrinogen I by the same enzyme (uroporphyrinogen decarboxylase) that acts on the III form; but that product, which is cytotoxic, then accumulates causing the pathology congenital erythropoietic porphyria.

References

Tetrapyrroles